Sabin Bălașa (June 17, 1932 – April 1, 2008) was a contemporary Romanian painter. His works were described by himself as belonging to cosmic Romanticism.

Biography
Bălașa was born in Dobriceni, Olt County. After  completing his secondary education at Frații Buzești High School in Craiova in 1950, he attended the Nicolae Grigorescu Fine Arts Institute in Bucharest, graduating in 1955. He continued his studies at Siena and Perugia, in Italy.

In 1973 and 1976 the Bucharest Mayor's office ordered and paid him to paint the portraits of Nicolae and Elena Ceaușescu. In the late 1980s, Bălașa was accused of promoting Ceaușescu's cult of personality.

In December 2000 he was awarded by President Emil Constantinescu the National Order of Merit, Commander rank.

In June 2005, Bălașa sued the French newspaper Le Monde for defamation after the paper reproduced a propaganda painting by another painter, claiming it was one of his. Le Monde subsequently acknowledged the error.

He died in 2008 from lung cancer at Sfânta Maria Hospital in Bucharest and was buried at Eternitatea Cemetery in Iași.

Works

Murals

Among Bălașa's most notable works are several large-scale fresco paintings.
Aspirație (Aspiration) – 380/546 cm
Omagiu Întemeietorilor (Homage To The Founders) – 372/471 cm
Amfiteatru (Amphitheatre) – 452/400 cm
Generații (Generations) – 452/379 cm
Triumful vieții (Triumph of Life) – 420/249 cm
Dezastrul atomic (Atomic Disaster) – 420/249 cm
Icar (Icarus) – 422/248 cm
Prometeu (Prometheus) – 417/247 cm
Exodul spre lumină (Exodus Towards the Light) – 416/247 cm
Ștefan Cel Mare – 419/250 cm
Moldova (Moldavia) – 430/265 cm
Luceafărul – triptych 429/267 cm, 430/267 cm, 431/269 cm
Bălașa used the image of Mihai Eminescu depicted in the nearby statue to paint the fresco in the university lobby, identifying the poet with the hero of Luceafărul.

Animated painting movies
Bălașa was the author and director of 12 animated painting movies: 

Picătura (The Drip) – 1966
Orașul (The City) – 1967
Valul (The Wave) – 1968
Pasărea Phoenix (The Phoenix Bird) – 1968
Fascinație (Fascination) – 1969
Întoarcere în viitor (Return to the Future) – 1971
Galaxia (The Galaxy) – 1973
Oda (The Ode) – 1975
Exodul spre lumină (Exodus Towards the Light) – 1979

Galleries in Romania and abroad
Rome 1978; Rome 1980; Stockholm 1982; National Museum of Art of Romania, Bucharest 1982; Kerkera Greece 1985; Moscow, Tbilisi and other capital cities of the ex-USSR 1988; Bucharest, 1992; Israel 1994; Bucharest World Trade Center 2000; Alexandru Ioan Cuza University, Iași 2002; Bucharest 2005.

References

External links
Paintings by Sabin Bălașa

1932 births
2008 deaths
People from Olt County
Bucharest National University of Arts alumni
Romanian muralists
20th-century Romanian painters
Recipients of the National Order of Merit (Romania)
Deaths from lung cancer in Romania
Burials at Eternitatea cemetery